This is a list of Swedish clergy and theologians.

Bishops
Mikael Agricola, bishop and reformer
Hans Brask, bishop
Bishop Henry, bishop
Lars Levi Laestadius, founder of the Laestadian movement
Christina Odenberg, first woman to become a bishop in the Church of Sweden
Laurentius Petri, archbishop and reformer
Olaus Petri, reformer
Nathan Söderblom, archbishop, Nobel Peace Prize laureate

Other clergy

Israel Acrelius (1714–1800), pastor in Rialla, Wilmington, Delaware, and Fellingsboro
Johan Campanius (1601–1683), clergyman assigned to New Sweden, translated the Lutheran Catechism into the Lenape language 
Elisabeth Djurle, one of the first three women to be ordained as priests of the Church of Sweden
Israel Israelsson Näslund III (1796–1858), pastor at Torsåker
Ingrid Persson (1912–2000), one of the first three women to be ordained as priests of the Church of Sweden
Lewi Pethrus (1884–1974), founder of the Swedish Pentecostal movement
Margit Sahlin (1914–2003), one of the first three women to be ordained as priests of the Church of Sweden
Reorus Torkillus (1608–1643), first Lutheran clergyman assigned to New Sweden

See also 
Church of Sweden
Roman Catholic Church
Archbishop of Uppsala
Bishop of Åbo
Ansgar – bishop and missionary to Sweden
List of Swedish saints

References

Clergymen
Swedish clergymen